El Chaltén is a small mountain village in Santa Cruz Province, Argentina. It is located on the riverside of Rio de las Vueltas, within the Los Glaciares National Park (section Reserva Nacional Zona Viedma) near the base of Cerro Torre and Cerro Fitz Roy spires, both popular for climbing. It is 220 km north of El Calafate.  It is also a popular base for hiking numerous trails, such as those to the base of surrounding peaks and glacial lakes, such as Laguna Torre and Laguna de los Tres (near the base of Fitz Roy).

For those reasons, El Chaltén was named Argentina's Trekking Capital or Capital Nacional del Trekking. Today the sole reason for its existence is tourism. In 1985, Argentina and Chile had a border dispute to gain and claim rights over El Chaltén. There was no war in the end, and El Chaltén was awarded to Argentina. Homes, government buildings, and flags of Argentina went up to mark the city settlement.

The town is located at the edge of the  Southern Patagonian Ice Field and about 350 inhabitants live there throughout all the seasons of the year. Snow and ice mostly fence the town, and the homes are low structured with roads mostly made of rocks and dirt.
In October 2014, El Chaltén took second place in a ranking of "Best cities in the world to know" of the travel guide Lonely Planet publishing in 2015, being the first city of Argentina.

Etymology 
"Chaltén" is a Tehuelche word meaning smoking mountain. They believed that Mount Chaltén was a volcano, for its peak is frequently covered by clouds. 

In 1877, Argentine explorer Francisco Moreno named mount Chaltén as mount Fitz Roy, in honour of Robert FitzRoy, captain during the Second voyage of HMS Beagle in the 1830s.

Tourism 

The village provides national park information for visitors, as well as commercial camping and a limited number of beds, catering mostly for backpackers. It has a few restaurants, bars, supermarkets and shops, with a large variety of outdoor equipment for sale. On the treks outside of the village free campsites are available. The town is nearly deserted during the off-season (the southern hemisphere winter).

Other visited tracks and sights are Torre Glacier, Laguna Capri, Piedras Blancas Glacier, Chorrillo del Salto, and Laguna de los Tres.

Climate 
El Chaltén has an unpredictable subpolar oceanic climate (Köppen Cfc) with subantarctic continental (Dfc) influences, with precipitation distributed on a large number of days despite not being nearly as heavy as in Chilean Patagonia; bad weather is exceedingly common. Summers experience long daylight hours, very windy weather, and cool temperatures, mostly below  during the day and below  during the night. Frost can and does occur in the summer too.
Winters bring snow in moderate quantities, and average temperatures around  during the day and  during the night; however, the coldest nights are much colder than this. Spring and fall are variable, but generally cold as well.

Gallery

References

External links 

 Official website

Populated places in Santa Cruz Province, Argentina
Cities in Argentina
Argentina
Santa Cruz Province, Argentina